Álvaro Holden Roberto (January 12, 1923 – August 2, 2007) was an Angolan politician who founded and led the National Liberation Front of Angola (FNLA) from 1962 to 1999. His memoirs are unfinished.

Early life
Roberto, son of Garcia Diasiwa Roberto and Joana Lala Nekaka, and a descendant of the Royal Family of the Kongo Kingdom, was born in São Salvador in the far north of Angola. His family moved to Léopoldville, in the Belgian Congo, in 1925. In 1940 he graduated from a Baptist mission school. He worked for the Belgian Finance Ministry in Léopoldville, Costermansville, and Stanleyville for eight years. In 1949, Roberto moved back to Léopoldville, where he joined his uncle in playing for the local "Nomads" football side. Roberto went on to play for Daring Club Motema Pembe, alongside the later Congolese Prime Minister, Cyrille Adoula. In 1951 he visited Angola and witnessed Portuguese officials abusing an old man, inspiring him to begin his political career.

Political career
Roberto and Sydney Manuel Barros Nekaka founded the Union of Peoples of Northern Angola (UPNA), later renamed the Union of Peoples of Angola (UPA), on July 14, 1954. Roberto, serving as UPA President, represented Angola in the All-African Peoples Congress of Ghana which he secretly attended in Accra, Ghana in December 1958. There he met Patrice Lumumba, the future Prime Minister of the Democratic Republic of the Congo, Kenneth Kaunda, the future President of Zambia, and Kenyan nationalist Tom Mboya. He acquired a Guinean passport and visited the United Nations. Jonas Savimbi, the future leader of UNITA, joined the UPA in February 1961 at the urging of Mboya and Kenyan Prime Minister Jomo Kenyatta. Later that year Roberto appointed Savimbi Secretary-General of the UPA.

The United States National Security Council began giving Roberto aid in the 1950s, paying him $6,000 annually until 1962 when the NSC increased his salary to $10,000 for intelligence-gathering.

National Liberation Front of Angola
After visiting the United Nations, he returned to Kinshasa and organized Bakongo militants. He launched an incursion into Angola on March 15, 1961, leading 4,000 to 5,000 militants. His forces took farms, government outposts, and trading centers, killing everyone they encountered. At least 1,000 whites and an unknown number of natives were killed. Commenting on the incursion, Roberto said, "this time the slaves did not cower". They massacred everything.

Roberto met with United States President John F. Kennedy on April 25, 1961. When he applied for aid later that year from the Ghanaian government, President Kwame Nkrumah turned him down on the grounds that the U.S. government was already paying him. Roberto merged the UPA with the Democratic Party of Angola to form the FNLA in March 1962 and a few weeks later established the Revolutionary Government of Angola in Exile (GRAE) on March 27, appointing Savimbi to the position of Foreign Minister. Roberto established a political alliance with Zairian President Mobutu Sese Seko by divorcing his wife and marrying a woman from Mobutu's wife's village. Roberto visited Israel in the 1960s and received aid from the Israeli government from 1963 to 1969.

Savimbi left the FNLA in 1964 and founded UNITA in response to Roberto's unwillingness to spread the war outside the traditional Kingdom of Kongo.

Zhou Enlai, Premier of the People's Republic of China, invited Roberto to visit the PRC in 1964. Roberto did not go because Moise Tshombe, the President of Katanga, told him he would not be allowed to return to the Congo.

On the eve of Angola's independence from Portugal, Zaire, in a bid to install a pro-Kinshasa government and thwart the People's Movement for the Liberation of Angola's (MPLA) drive for power, deployed armored car units, paratroops, and three battalions to Angola. However, the FNLA and Zaire's victory was narrowly averted by a massive influx of Cuban forces, who resoundingly defeated them.

In 1976, the MPLA defeated the FNLA in the Battle of Quifangondo and the FNLA retreated to Zaire.

While Roberto and Agostinho Neto's proposed policies for an independent Angola were similar, Roberto drew support from western Angola and Neto drew from eastern Angola. Neto, under the banner of nationalism and Communism, received support from the Soviet Union while Roberto, under the banner of nationalism and anti-Communism, received support from the United States, China, and Zaire. Roberto staunchly opposed Neto's drive to unite the Angolan rebel groups in opposition to Portugal because Roberto believed the FNLA would be absorbed by the MPLA. The FNLA abducted MPLA members, deported them to Kinshasa, and killed them.

In 1991, the FNLA and MPLA agreed to the Bicesse Accords, allowing Roberto to return to Angola. He ran unsuccessfully for president, receiving only 2.1% of the vote. However, the FNLA won five seats in Parliament but refused to participate in the government.

Roberto died on August 2, 2007, at his home in Luanda. After Roberto's death, President José Eduardo dos Santos eulogized, "Holden Roberto was one of the pioneers of national liberation struggle, whose name encouraged a generation of Angolans to opt for resistance and combat for the country's independence," and released a decree appointing a commission to arrange for a funeral ceremony.

References

Further reading
Chris Dempster, Fire Power (first hand account of foreign mercenaries fighting on the side of the FNLA) 

Angolan revolutionaries
1923 births
2007 deaths
Belgian Congo people
Genocide perpetrators
African and Black nationalists
Angolan anti-communists
Angolan Baptists
Angolan Kongo people
National Liberation Front of Angola politicians
People from Zaire Province
People of the Central Intelligence Agency
20th-century Angolan people
Candidates for President of Angola
Angolan independence activists
20th-century Baptists
Angolan expatriates in the Belgian Congo